The 1981–83 Balkans Cup was an edition of the Balkans Cup, a football competition for representative clubs from the Balkan states. It was contested by 6 teams and Beroe Stara Zagora won the trophy.

Group A

Notes
Note 1: Galatasaray withdrew from the tournament after playing their first two games.

Group B

Finals

First leg

Second leg

Beroe Stara Zagora won 6–1 on aggregate.

References

External links 

 RSSSF Archive → Balkans Cup
 
 Mehmet Çelik. "Balkan Cup". Turkish Soccer

1981
1981–82 in European football
1982–83 in European football
1981–82 in Romanian football
1982–83 in Romanian football
1981–82 in Greek football
1982–83 in Greek football
1981–82 in Bulgarian football
1982–83 in Bulgarian football
1981–82 in Turkish football
1982–83 in Turkish football
1981–82 in Yugoslav football
1982–83 in Yugoslav football
1981–82 in Albanian football
1982–83 in Albanian football